Beni M'Tir is a Tunisian commune in the Jendouba Governorate, a few miles away from Aïn Draham. It lies at an elevation of 650 metres and has a population of 811.

References

Populated places in Jendouba Governorate
Communes of Tunisia